One Piece Film: Gold is a 2016 Japanese animated fantasy action adventure film directed by Hiroaki Miyamoto and produced by Toei Animation. The film is part of the One Piece film series, based on the manga series of the same name written and illustrated by Eiichiro Oda. It had its world premiere at the Emirates Palace hotel in Abu Dhabi on July 15, 2016, and later premiered in Japan on July 23, 2016. On October 5, 2016, Funimation announced that they acquired the rights to screen the film in the United States and Canada on January 10–17, 2017.

Plot

The Straw Hat Pirates arrive at Gran Tesoro, a ship and entertainment city ruled by Gild Tesoro. The concierge Baccarat gives the Straw Hats a VIP stay due to their fame, and they go to a casino, where they win a lot of money. Baccarat then takes them to the VIP lounge to meet Tesoro, who challenges them to a dice game. 

However, Baccarat uses her Devil Fruit abilities to strip Luffy of his luck, causing him to lose. She reveals her foul play and the Straw Hats refuse to give up their money, causing them to fight Baccarat, Tesoro, and his subordinates Mr. Tanaka and Dice. They are overwhelmed, and Tesoro, who can manipulate gold, captures Zoro by manipulating the gold dust sprayed on him when he entered Gran Tesoro. Tesoro gives the Straw Hats until midnight the next day to repay their debt, or he will execute Zoro. Outside, the Straw Hats run into Carina, a former acquaintance of Nami's who is now working for Tesoro. 

They hatch a plan with Carina to steal money kept in the main hotel, and find out that most people in the city are enslaved to Tesoro. Tesoro pays CP-0 agent Spandam to send World Government forces after the Straw Hats. The next day, the Straw Hats split up into two teams and infiltrate the hotel. Team A, Luffy and Franky, scale it from the outside in order to disable its surveillance network. They disable it, but are caught by security. Tesoro and Tanaka then confront them, and Tesoro binds Luffy's arms in gold before Tanaka sends them plummeting into the Golden Prison, a large cavern filled with nothing, but gold.

Luffy and Franky meet Raise Max, a legendary gambler and member of the Revolutionary Army who takes them through a dangerous pipe system to get to a seawater pipeline and wash the gold off to Luffy. They reach the pipeline after Max stops a giant spinning fan. Meanwhile, the rest of the Straw Hats and Carina sneak into the room containing the money, only to find themselves on a stage as part of a trap laid by Tesoro and Carina. Tesoro reveals that he knows where Luffy and Franky are and attempts to drown them by flooding their location with seawater. He then attempts to execute Zoro, but when trying to release liquid gold from Gran Tesoro's fountains, seawater comes out instead. 

Carina's group reveals that they had intended for all of this to happen in order for the seawater to be released, and the seawater frees everyone from Tesoro's control by washing the gold dust off them. Luffy and Franky's group emerges from a fountain, and the Straw Hats reunite as Gran Tesoro's citizens and prisoners rise up against Tesoro and his crew. Intent on remaining in control, Tesoro blows up the hotel and forms it into golden armor for his subordinates and a giant golem that he occupies. The Straw Hats fight Tesoro's crew, and Luffy goes after Tesoro, but is overwhelmed. Marine forces led by Rob Lucci then attack Gran Tesoro, and Spandam captures Luffy. However, Sabo intercepts Lucci, and a child that Luffy inspired saves him from Spandam.

The Straw Hats defeat Baccarat, Tanaka, and Dice, and Luffy uses Gear Four to destroy Tesoro's golem. Tesoro turns the golem into liquid gold, which traps everyone except Luffy. Tesoro attacks Luffy with a massive tendril of gold, but Luffy destroys it and defeats him, sending him flying into the Marine fleet where he is arrested. Everyone is freed from the gold, but Gran Tesoro then appears to go into a self-destruct protocol. Carina decides to stay behind while everyone else evacuates, and as the Straw Hats depart, they realize the protocol was false and Carina has control over Gran Tesoro. As the Straw Hats are chased by the Marine fleet, Carina sails Gran Tesoro into the distance.

Voice cast

Production

Music and soundtrack 
As a fan of the band, Eiichiro Oda personally requested that they provide the theme. The film's staff asked the group to write something different than what would typically be associated with One Piece and to evoke the feeling of "battling Luffy." The first song they brought was not what the staff had in mind and they were suggested to write something more "unrefined" and "Iggy Pop-ish", to which Glim Spanky responded with "Ikari o Kure yo".

Release 
The film was released in Japan on July 23, 2016 by its distributor Toei Company, on 739 screens in 344 theatres across the country.

The Blu-ray was released on December 28, 2016, in Japan and was released on 7 April 2017 in Germany, and 2 May 2017 in the U.S.

Selecta Visión released the film in Spain and Portugal on DVD and Blu-ray on 12 April 2017, featuring Japanese, Spanish and Catalan audio, as well as subtitles in Spanish, Catalan and Portuguese. Previously, the film had been premiered in theaters in Spain on 4 November 2016, dubbed in Spanish and Catalan. It was the first One Piece film to be released in cinemas in Spain.

Marketing

Reception

Box office
The film grossed  on its opening weekend in Japan. It earned ¥1,516,450,600 from the 1,088,166 ticket sales in its first four days. It grossed  by August 16, 2016. By the end of 2016, it had grossed  in Japan, and was one of the year's top five highest-grossing domestic films.

In China, it grossed the biggest three-day total in China of any Japanese film for 2016, up until the release of Your Name. Film: Gold went on to gross  in China. The film also grossed  in South Korea, and $423,593 in the United States and Canada.

Critical reception
On review aggregator website Rotten Tomatoes, the film holds an approval rating of 67%, based on 9 reviews, and an average rating of 6.2/10. On Metacritic, the film has a weighted average score of 43 out of 100, based on 4 critics, indicating "mixed or average reviews".

Home media
The film was released in Japan in standard and limited edition DVD and Blu-ray formats on December 28, 2016. The limited edition "Golden Limited Edition" contains with interview of Eiichiro Oda, making of and application card for event, TV spot, trailer, and much more. Comes with golden earphones, a pen, Gran Tesoro Adventure original board game, golden casino-chip menko cards, and an unreleased press material. By the end of the year in Japan, the movie Gold had sold approximately 79,932 copies of DVDs and Blu-rays.

Koch Media released the film in Italy on DVD and Blu-ray on April 6, 2017. Selecta Visión released the film in Spain on DVD and Blu-ray on 12 April 2017, featuring Japanese, Spanish and Catalan audio, also with subtitles in Spanish and Catalan. On April 17, 2017 Kazé Anime launched Germany two versions of the home video, the Standard Edition Blu-ray/DVD and the Limited Deluxe Edition. In North America, Funimation released the film on DVD and Blu-ray on May 2, 2017.

See also
 List of One Piece films
 List of One Piece media

Notes

References

External links
 
 

2016 anime films
Gold
2016 films
Toei Animation films
Films about gambling
Animated action films
Animated adventure films
Action anime and manga
Adventure anime and manga
Funimation
Japanese fantasy adventure films
Japanese action adventure films
Japanese animated fantasy films
Japanese heist films
2010s action adventure films
2010s fantasy adventure films
Films scored by Yuki Hayashi